A Mighty Wind is a 2003 American mockumentary comedy film about a folk music reunion concert in which three folk bands reunite for a television performance for the first time in decades. Co-written (with Eugene Levy), directed, and composed by Christopher Guest, the film is widely acknowledged to reference folk music producer Harold Leventhal as the inspiration for the character of Irving Steinbloom and more broadly parodies the American folk music revival of the early 1960s and its personalities.

Guest co-stars and reunites many of his company of actors from This Is Spinal Tap, Waiting for Guffman, and Best in Show for this film, including Eugene Levy, Catherine O'Hara, Michael McKean, Harry Shearer, Fred Willard, Bob Balaban, Ed Begley Jr., Jennifer Coolidge, John Michael Higgins, Jane Lynch and Parker Posey.

Plot 
After fictional folk music producer Irving Steinbloom dies, his children Jonathan, Naomi, and Elliott organize a memorial concert, which they hope to feature his three most famous acts: The Folksmen, The New Main Street Singers, and Mitch & Mickey.

The Folksmen trio — Mark Shubb, Alan Barrows, and Jerry Palter — were once the most popular of the acts but have not appeared together in decades. They had several minor hits, and their most famous song was "Old Joe's Place." Despite not playing or seeing each other for many years, their reunion is very positive and full of good memories, so they diligently begin rehearsing for the concert. Although some tension arises over whether to include "Skeletons of Quinto", a convoluted, somber song about the Spanish Civil War, in their otherwise upbeat set list, they clearly enjoy working together again. 

The New Main Street Singers are the second generation of the original Main Street Singers, formed by George Menschell, the only living member of the original group, who sings and holds a guitar he cannot play. Performers include Terry Bohner and his wife Laurie, a former adult film star, now founders of Witches in Nature's Colors (WINC), a coven of modern-day witches that worships the power of color, and former juvenile delinquent Sissy Knox, the daughter of Fred Knox, one of the original Main Street Singers. Their manager, Mike LaFontaine, most famously appeared in a short-lived and mostly forgotten 1970 sitcom, Wha' Happened?, but is constantly puzzling others by quoting his character Li'l Eddie Dees' catchphrases, including the show's titular tagline. The group is known for their complex harmonies, forming what Menschell terms a "neuftet".

Mitch Cohen and Mickey Crabbe appeared as Mitch & Mickey, a former couple that released seven albums and ended performances of their most famous song, "A Kiss at the End of the Rainbow," by kissing each other. After a dramatic break-up years before the events of the film, Mickey seemingly moved on and has married a medical supply salesman, but Mitch broke down emotionally and has never fully recovered. As the pair reunite and rehearse, romantic tension and personal regrets repeatedly threaten their participation in the concert.

The three groups, all of whom have sunk to various levels of musical irrelevance since their respective heyday, agree to the reunion performance, to be held at The Town Hall in New York and televised live on PBN (a reference to PBS). The film features rehearsals for the show along with interviews with the performers discussing their activities over the previous years and their feelings about performing again. 

The show itself proceeds with only two hitches: the intended opening song for The Folksmen's set is played first by the New Main Street Singers (a song called "Never Did No Wanderin'", which the Folksmen sing in a rugged, emotional manner consistent with the spirit of the song, while the New Main Street Singers perform it in their usual peppy, carefree way), and Mitch temporarily disappears minutes before he and Mickey are to perform, forcing the Folksmen to extend their set. It turns out that Mitch had gone to buy a rose for Mickey, which she gratefully accepts as they go on stage. They perform "A Kiss at the End of the Rainbow", and after a suspenseful pause, they do the much-anticipated kiss at the end. In the finale, all three acts sing "A Mighty Wind" together.

Six months after the concert, many of the performers detail subsequent events via interviews. Mickey is performing "The Sure-Flo Song" (about a medical device used for bladder control) at her husband Leonard's trade show booth, while Mitch is writing poetry again, claiming to be in a "prolific phase". Mickey claims that Mitch overreacted to their onstage kiss, while Mitch insists that he no longer has feelings for Mickey, but had worried that Mickey's feelings for him might have returned.  LaFontaine is trying to drum up interest for a sitcom called "Supreme Folk", in which the New Main Street Singers star as characters who are Supreme Court judges by day and folk singers sharing a house by night. The Folksmen have reunited, but Mark Shubb, now a transgender woman, has revamped her wardrobe and continues to sing in her deep bass voice, followed now by a girlish giggle.

Cast

Production

Origins

Guest, McKean and Shearer first appeared as The Folksmen in a season 10 episode of Saturday Night Live that aired on November 3, 1984, when Guest and Shearer were both repertory cast members of the show and McKean was that week's host. Earlier that year, Guest, McKean and Shearer had appeared as the titular group in the mockumentary This Is Spinal Tap, a parody of aging heavy metal bands. McKean later stated, "I came and hosted a show, and in lieu of another 'Tap' piece, we did these guys."

The Folksmen later appeared in Spinal Tap's 1992 TV special, The Return of Spinal Tap, and the original concept for A Mighty Wind was to give The Folksmen their own narrative vehicle.

Development
"A Kiss at the End of the Rainbow", which was composed for the film by Michael McKean and wife Annette O'Toole, was nominated for an Academy Award for Best Original Song.

In the commentary for the DVD release, Christopher Guest and Eugene Levy noted that, in a scene cut from the finished movie, it is explained that Menschell cannot play the guitar. However, just before a performance of the original Main Street Singers, he stained his shirt front and covered it up by holding a guitar for the performance, something he continued to do for all subsequent performances.

Music

Soundtrack

The official soundtrack, titled A Mighty Wind: The Album, was released on April 8, 2003, shortly before the film's premiere. It peaked at number 20 on the Billboard Top Soundtracks chart.

Credits adapted from the album's liner notes and AllMusic.

Promotional tour
Following the release of the film, the cast performed a show in character at the Getty Center in Los Angeles. This was followed by a seven-city U.S. tour in the fall of 2003 to promote the release of the film on DVD. The tour dates were: Philadelphia (Tower Theater, September 19), New York City (The Town Hall, September 20), Washington, D.C. (The 9:30 Club, September 21), Boston (Orpheum Theatre, September 22), Los Angeles (Wilshire Theatre, November 8), San Francisco (Warfield Theatre, November 9) and Seattle (McCaw Hall, November 14), with an additional performance in Vancouver, BC.

Reception

Critical response 
The film received mostly positive reviews. On Rotten Tomatoes the film has an approval rating of 87% based on reviews from 175 critics, and an average rating of 7.35/10, with the sites consensus, "Though not as uproariously funny as Guest's previous movies, A Mighty Wind is also more heartfelt." On Metacritic the film has a score of 81% based on reviews from 40 critics, indicating "universal acclaim".

San Francisco Chronicles Mick LaSalle stated that it "gently caricatures the folk music scene with dozens of delicate brush strokes, creating a picture that's increasingly, gloriously funny – as in entire lines of dialogue are lost because the audience's laughing so hard." The review also displayed a drawing of the newspaper's character of The Little Man giving a standing ovation (the Chronicles equivalent of a five-star rating). Roger Ebert stated that "though there were many times when I laughed", "the edge is missing from Guest's usual style" perhaps because he "is too fond of the characters". Ebert gave the film two-and-a-half stars out of four.

Awards 
 
Michael McKean and Annette O'Toole were nominated for the Academy Award for Best Original Song, for the song "A Kiss at the End of the Rainbow," which was performed at the 76th Academy Awards by Levy and O'Hara (in character). "A Mighty Wind" won the Best Song Written for a Motion Picture, Television or Other Visual Media award for Christopher Guest, Eugene Levy, and Michael McKean at the 46th Grammy Awards.

Box office 
The film had a moderate intake for its opening day in April 2003, grossing $307,931 in total. It went on to gross $2,112,140 in 133 theatres for an average of $15,880 per theatre. With a domestic total of $17,583,468 and an international total of $969,240, the film brought in a total of $18,750,246 during its theatrical run.

References

External links
 
 
 
 
 Christopher Guest interview for A Mighty Wind

2000s parody films
2003 films
American parody films
Castle Rock Entertainment films
Films about music and musicians
Films set in New York City
Films shot in Connecticut
American mockumentary films
Saturday Night Live films
Warner Bros. films
Films directed by Christopher Guest
Films with screenplays by Christopher Guest
Films with screenplays by Eugene Levy
Transgender-related films
2003 comedy films
2000s English-language films
2000s American films